Amolops spinapectoralis is a species of frog in the family Ranidae, the "true frogs". It is at present only known from a few locations in central Vietnam—that is, it is endemic to Vietnam—but it is likely to be found more widely in the Vietnamese Central Highlands as well as in the adjacent southeastern Laos and northeastern Cambodia. The specific name spinapectoralis is derived from Latin spina for "thorn" and pectoralis for "of the breast" and refers to the pectoral spines in adult males. Common name spinyback torrent frog has been coined for it.

Description
Adult females measure  and adult males  in snout–vent length, although only males larger than  SVL had nuptial pads in addition to vocal sacs. The overall appearance is stocky. The snout is obtusely pointed or rounded in dorsal view and rounded in profile. The tympanum is visible. The fingers are without webbing but bear truncate discs. The toes are fully webbed and have discs that are smaller than finger discs. Skin is dorsally granular, tuberculate on the sides, and smooth ventrally. The dorsum and head have  large black spots surrounded by olive brown network. The iris is olive brown with fine black network. Males have conspicuous and bowed prepollex, nuptial pads consisting of about 100 white, conical spines, and an oval group of similar spines on each side of chest, as referred to in the specific name.

Habitat and conservation
Its natural history is poorly known but it is likely restricted to areas near cascades and swiftly flowing streams, as with other Amolops. Reproduction probably occurs in the same streams.

This species can be very abundant locally. However, it is threatened by habitat loss and degradation caused by expanding agriculture; large areas of forest are being converted to  cash crop plantations such as rubber, coffee, and tea. It is also harvested for local consumption, but it is not known whether this is a considerable threat. The species occurs in the Kon Ka Kinh National Park and Ngọc Linh Nature Reserve.

References

spinapectoralis
Frogs of Asia
Amphibians of Vietnam
Endemic fauna of Vietnam
Amphibians described in 1999
Taxa named by Ilya Darevsky
Taxa named by Robert F. Inger
Taxa named by Nikolai Loutseranovitch Orlov
Taxonomy articles created by Polbot